Mount Hunter is a mountain in northern Stribog Mountains,  high, standing  west-southwest of Duclaux Point on Pasteur Peninsula, Brabant Island, in the Palmer Archipelago, Antarctica. It surmounts Podayva Glacier to the north, Burevestnik Glacier to the northeast, Lister Glacier to the southeast and Dodelen Glacier to the west.

The mountain was shown on an Argentine government chart in 1953, but not named. It was photographed by Hunting Aerosurveys Ltd in 1956–57, and mapped from these photos in 1959. The feature was named by the UK Antarctic Place-Names Committee for John Hunter, a British surgeon, comparative anatomist and physiologist, who revolutionized the approach to surgery as an exact science in relation to other aspects of medicine.

Maps
 Antarctic Digital Database (ADD). Scale 1:250000 topographic map of Antarctica. Scientific Committee on Antarctic Research (SCAR). Since 1993, regularly upgraded and updated.
British Antarctic Territory. Scale 1:200000 topographic map. DOS 610 Series, Sheet W 64 62. Directorate of Overseas Surveys, Tolworth, UK, 1980.
Brabant Island to Argentine Islands. Scale 1:250000 topographic map. British Antarctic Survey, 2008.

References

Mountains of the Palmer Archipelago